Pemphis is a genus of maritime plants in family Lythraceae. It was recently thought have only one species  (the type species, described in 1775, Pemphis acidula ) but is now believed to have at least two.

Pemphis are highly adaptive. Depending on environmental factors, they are densely branched, or low and spreading bushes or short trees, with main stems that can be furcated and lie nearly prone, or develop into one erect trunk. Leaves can be small, fleshy and succulent, or larger, flat and not fleshy. All surfaces are covered generally in silky, colorless trichomes. The fruits and bee-pollinated flowers are produced throughout the year. Seeds can float, and are sometimes propagated through water dispersal.

Habitat 
Most Pemphis live either at the verges of mangrove forests, well away from the forest-ocean interface; or they colonize beaches behind the intertidal zone, taking hold on rocks, gravel or sand, laterite or limestone, and frequently on promontories or crags.

Range and distribution 
They are not common, but far ranging from coastal, eastern Africa (including the Seychelles, and the Zanzibar Archipelago), states with Indian Ocean coastlines, to the Pacific (Philippines, Cook Islands), northwards up to Taiwan and the Ryukyu Islands Other places reporting Pemphis include mainland coastal Tanzania, Thailand, Malaysia (Johore), Singapore, Indonesia (Papua, Sumatra, the Moluccas, Madura and Java), Papua New Guinea, Hong Kong and throughout tropical Australia. On Java in particular (where it is known as stigi or santigi), some areas are uncharacteristically abundant.

Uses 
Despite the difficulty presented for the prospective carver, wood from Pemphis species is highly prized for its extreme heaviness, toughness and resistance to warping. It is usually  fashioned into walking canes, fence posts, tool handles, and even anchors, exhibiting a fine finish.

Pemphis acidula is a valuable tropical species for bonsai, particularly in Asia.

Species 
This list is according to The Plant List. Species that are as yet unresolved (i.e. neither accepted nor synonyms) are indicated by a red asterisk (*); synonyms have been omitted.

Pemphis acidula J.R.Forst. & G.Forst. (type)
Pemphis hexandra Mart. ex Koehne*
Pemphis madagascariensis (Baker) Koehne
Pemphis stachydifolia Mart. ex Koehne*

See also 
Mangroves

References 

Lythraceae genera
Plants used in bonsai
Lythraceae